"Quédate conmigo" ("") is a song recorded by Spanish singer Pastora Soler. The song was written by Thomas G:son, Tony Sánchez-Ohlsson and Erik Bernholm. It is best known as the Spanish entry at the Eurovision Song Contest 2012, in Baku.

Background
On 21 December 2011, Soler was announced by RTVE as the Spanish representative in the Eurovision Song Contest 2012. Soler and her team picked four songs to be in contention for the Eurovision Song Contest, and she sang three of these at the Spanish national final. "Quédate conmigo", together with "Tu vida es tu vida", was selected directly by Soler for the national final, whereas "Ahora o nunca" was selected through an online vote over "Me despido de ti". Unlike "Tu vida es tu vida", "Quédate conmigo" was not a song from Soler's latest album Una mujer como yo, she chose it from over 200 proposals she received through her record company. According to Soler, it became her favourite the moment she listened to it.

At the national final, which took place on 3 March 2012, the winning song was determined by 50% televoting and 50% jury vote. "Quédate conmigo" got the highest score by both the juries and televote, and thus was chosen to represent Spain in the Eurovision Song Contest 2012.

Release
The song was released in its first version in Spain on digital platforms on 28 February 2012, both as a single and as part of a 4-track EP, Especial Eurovisión, containing her candidate songs for Eurovision.

The final Eurovision version of the song, with polished production, was included in a special reissue of Una mujer como yo, Soler's latest album, which was re-released on 27 March 2012. This version was also released as a single on digital platforms on 30 March 2012 as "Quédate conmigo (Versión Bakú)".

Soler recorded an English-language version of the song, "Stay With Me", which was released on digital platforms on 24 July 2012.

Music video
The official music video of the song premiered on 19 March 2012. The video focuses on Pastora Soler, with medium shots and close-ups of her against a black backdrop. These images are alternated with a couple of dancers. The music video served to introduce the final version of the song for the Eurovision Song Contest.

Eurovision Song Contest 
"Quédate conmigo" was Spain's entry for the Eurovision Song Contest 2012. By representing a "big five" country, it automatically qualified for the final on 26 May 2012. Spain was drawn in position 19 out of the 26 available spots during the running order draw. In the end the song managed to reach 10th place with 97 points, achieving the first top 10 result for Spain since 2004.

Other versions
In 2013, Rafa Blas, known for winning talent show La Voz, included a cover of the song in his debut studio album Mi Voz.

In July 2016, María Jimena sang "Quédate conmigo" in the Knockout stage of season five of La Voz... México.

On 4 December 2017, Nerea performed the song on Gala 6 of season nine of Spanish reality television talent competition Operación Triunfo in the presence of the original singer of this song Pastora Soler.

In March 2019, Agoney performed the song during the gala dedicated to the music of the 2010s of the TVE show La mejor canción jamás cantada, where it was voted by the audience as the best Spanish song from this decade. During the finale of the show, it was performed by Gerónimo Rauch.

Charts

Weekly charts

Year-end charts

References

External links
Official music video at YouTube
Eurovision performance at YouTube

Eurovision songs of 2012
Eurovision songs of Spain
Songs written by Thomas G:son
2012 songs
Warner Music Group singles
Songs written by Tony Sánchez-Ohlsson
Songs written by Erik Bernholm